The men's 1000 metres race of the 2014–15 ISU Speed Skating World Cup 2, arranged in the Taereung International Ice Rink, in Seoul, South Korea, was held on 22 November 2014.

The race was won by Pavel Kulizhnikov of Russia, while Stefan Groothuis of the Netherlands in second place, and Kjeld Nuis of the Netherlands in third place. Kim Jin-su of South Korea won Division B.

Results
The race took place on Saturday, 22 November, with Division B scheduled in the morning session, at 10:55, and Division A scheduled in the afternoon session, at 16:18.

Division A

Division B

References

Men 01000
2